The Last Thieves (literally "Sages and Thieves") is a 2019 Taiwanese drama film written and directed by Jack Hsu. The film stars Yen Tsao and Joanne Tseng as young entrepreneurs who are pitted against the elites of the social hierarchy, played by Megan Lai and Eric Tsang.

The film is billed as Asia's first Blockchain corporate warfare movie and introduces the concept of Blockchain decentralization and immersive entertainment.

Cast 
 Megan Lai as Hsu Ching
 Yen Tsao as Yin Tzu-hsiang
 Joanne Tseng as Chen Hsi
 Eric Tsang as Lin Ming-yen
 Hou Yan-xi as Nick
 Wu Chien-ho as Tai Yi
 Kao Ying-hsuan as Chen Fa-tong
 Johnny Lu as Kao Yu-hsiu
 Heaven Hai as Show host

Awards and nominations

References 

2019 films
Taiwanese drama films
Fiction about corporate warfare
2019 drama films
2010s Mandarin-language films